Félix Ocampo (born 8 January 1941) is a Filipino boxer. He competed in the men's light middleweight event at the 1964 Summer Olympics. At the 1964 Summer Olympics, he lost to Anthony Barber of Australia.

References

1941 births
Living people
Filipino male boxers
Olympic boxers of the Philippines
Boxers at the 1964 Summer Olympics
Place of birth missing (living people)
Asian Games medalists in boxing
Boxers at the 1966 Asian Games
Asian Games bronze medalists for the Philippines
Medalists at the 1966 Asian Games
Light-middleweight boxers